The ABU Radio Song Festival 2014 was the second edition of the biennial ABU Radio Song Festivals, organised by the Asia-Pacific Broadcasting Union (ABU). The festival took place on 23 May 2014 in the Sri Lankan city of Colombo. The Nelum Pokuna Mahinda Rajapaksa Theatre was originally chosen as the host venue, but was later moved to the Stein Studios. Twelve countries participated the song festival. The festival was to be originally hosted by ABC Australia however for unknown reasons this did not occur.

Location 

Colombo is the largest city and the commercial, industrial and cultural capital of Sri Lanka. It is located on the west coast of the island and adjacent to Sri Jayawardenapura Kotte suburb or the parliament capital of Sri Lanka. Colombo is also the administrative capital of Western Province, Sri Lanka and the district capital of Colombo District. Colombo is often referred to as the capital since Sri Jayawardenapura Kotte is a satellite city of Colombo. Colombo is a busy and vibrant place with a mixture of modern life and colonial buildings and ruins with a population of about 752,993 in the city limits. It was the political capital of Sri Lanka, before Sri Jayawardenapura Kotte.

The original venue selected to host the festival was the Nelum Pokuna Mahinda Rajapaksa Theatre, in Colombo. The theatre is equipped with ultra modern facilities such as an auditorium with 1,288 seats, a library, and training facilities.

On 21 March 2014, ABU announced Stein Studios would be the new venue for this year's edition. Its Founders Block studio is over 15,600sq ft (1500 sq m) in area and can turn into a 2000-seat theater.

Format 
Unlike the format used in the Eurovision Song Contest there are two versions of the Song Festivals, ABU Radio and ABU TV Song Festivals. The ABU Radio Song Festival which took place on 23 May 2014 coincided with the Radio Asia 2014 event that took place between 22–24 May 2014.

Participating countries 
A total of 12 countries took part in this years festival.

Unlike the  festival, this year's festival had no awards presented to the top five acts.  The festival organiser's presented 'Tokens of Appreciation' to the performers as a sign of recognition of the diverse range of musical genre.

Order of performance

Did not qualify 
Of the sixteen preliminary entries, twelve were selected to proceed to the final of the ABU Radio Song Festival. The remaining four did not qualify (as shown in the following table)

Other countries 
  – On 30 December 2013, the station manager of Centennial Radio confirmed to Eurovoix.com that they would not be taking part in the 2014 contest.

See also 
 ABU Song Festivals
 ABU TV Song Festival 2014
 Asia-Pacific Broadcasting Union
 Eurovision Song Contest 2014
 Eurovision Young Musicians 2014
 Junior Eurovision Song Contest 2014

References

External links 
Official website of ABU Radio Song Festival

2014 in Sri Lanka
ABU Song Festivals
2014 in radio
21st century in Colombo
Festivals in Sri Lanka
2014 song contests